Bahman Mohammadi (born 1957) is an Iranian conservative politician. He was a member of the 7th and 8th Islamic Consultative Assembly. During his time in parliament, he was a member of the Agriculture and Natural Resources Commission.

References 

1957 births
Members of the 7th Islamic Consultative Assembly
Members of the 8th Islamic Consultative Assembly
Living people